The Parliament of the United Kingdom is dissolved automatically five years after the day on which it first met or earlier by the Sovereign by royal proclamation at the request of the Prime Minister. The prerogative power to dissolve Parliament was revived by the Dissolution and Calling of Parliament Act 2022, which also repealed Fixed-term Parliaments Act 2011. By virtue of amendments made by the Dissolution and Calling of Parliament Act to Schedule 1 to the Representation of the People Act 1983, the dissolution of Parliament automatically triggers a general election for the next Parliament.

Members of Parliament cease to be so, as soon as it is dissolved, and they may not enter the Palace of Westminster, although they and their staff continue to be paid until polling day. Parliament is usually prorogued or adjourned before it is dissolved. Parliament may continue to sit for a wash-up period of a few days after the prime minister has announced the date when Parliament will be dissolved, to finish some last items of parliamentary business.

After Parliament has dissolved, a royal proclamation is made summoning a new Parliament, fixing the date when the new Parliament is to assemble, and requiring the issuing of writs of summons to the Lords Spiritual and Temporal and writs of election for the members of the House of Commons. If Parliament is dissolved by proclamation, the proclamation dissolving it will usually also summon the next one. While it is the royal proclamation, and subsequent Order in Council, which direct the issue of writs of election, the amended parliamentary election rules direct that a writ is to be deemed to have been received the day after Parliament has been dissolved and that therefore, the general election process can begin before the writ is received by returning officers. The poll for the general election is held 25 working days (a day which is not a weekend, bank holiday or a day of national mourning or thanksgiving) after Parliament is dissolved. By tradition, a copy of the royal proclamation is delivered by hand from the Privy Council Office to Mansion House in the City of London. It is then read out by the Common Cryer (also called Mace-bearer or Serjeant-at-Arms) of the City on the steps of the Royal Exchange in the heart of the City, having been handed to him by the Common Serjeant of the City, ahead of its being also read out in the London boroughs. This tradition was again carried out in May 2017.

The last dissolution of Parliament was on 6 November 2019, to make way for the general election to be held on 12 December.

Parliament was dissolved automatically due to the expiration of its term for the first time on 30 March 2015, as opposed to being dissolved by royal proclamation. Although provision was made by the Septennial Act 1715 for Parliament to dissolve automatically after seven, and later five years, in practice dissolution was always effected shortly before the end of the five-year period by means of a royal proclamation. Although Prime Minister David Cameron met the Queen on the day of the dissolution, the only business discussed was the calling of the new Parliament, and not a request for a dissolution, as had happened at every such meeting historically, and the subsequent royal proclamation made on 30 March simply called for the holding of the next Parliament. At the 2015 general election, the period between the dissolution of the previous Parliament and the meeting of the new Parliament was the longest period the United Kingdom had been without a Parliament since 1924.

In accordance with the provisions of the Early Parliamentary General Election Act 2019, Parliament was dissolved without passing the motion cited under the provisions of section 2(2) of the Fixed-term Parliaments Act 2011, which was then the default mechanism for dissolving Parliament prior to the expiration of its term. The 2019 Act fixed the polling day for the next general election as 12 December 2019, as if it had under section 2(7) of the Fixed-term Parliaments Act. This caused Parliament to be dissolved by virtue of section 3(1) of the Fixed-term Parliaments Act on 6 November.

Previous situation
Prior to the Fixed-term Parliaments Act, each Parliament would have expired after a five-year term, as laid down in the Septennial Act 1715 (as amended by the Parliament Act 1911). This could, however, be overridden at the pleasure of Parliament. The length of a Parliament was extended on two occasions since 1911, once during each of the two World Wars. At any time the Sovereign could dissolve Parliament and call a general election. In accordance with constitutional convention, the Sovereign did not act independently, but at the request of the Prime Minister. Constitutional experts, who are unnamed, held that the monarch might refuse permission if a Parliament had more than a year still to run and if another person could potentially command a majority in the House of Commons (see the Lascelles Principles), meaning that in practice a Prime Minister with a Commons majority and enjoying the support of his party had de facto authority to dissolve Parliament at a time of his choosing. Prior to 1918, it was the Cabinet who collectively sought permission from the monarch in order for Parliament to be dissolved. However, since 1918, the Prime Minister alone sought the permission of the Sovereign.

Fixed term parliaments were introduced by the Fixed-term Parliaments Act 2011 following the Conservative–Liberal Democrat coalition agreement promulgated after the 2010 election, thereby abolishing the ability of the Prime Minister unilaterally to request an election prior to the expiry of the five-year term. By the Fixed-term Parliaments Act, general elections were to be held at fixed intervals and Parliament was to be dissolved 17, later 25 working days before the polling day for the next general election. The date for the next general election could be brought forward if the House of Commons passed a motion of no confidence in the Government or passed a motion for an early general election with a two-thirds majority. The Act did not affect the Sovereign's power to prorogue Parliament.

Under the Fixed-term Parliaments Act, writs of election were issued to the returning officers of each constituency automatically by virtue of section 3(3) of the Act. This was due to the fact that the royal proclamation no longer summoned the holding of the election, but only the meeting of the new Parliament.

The 2017 general election was called by virtue of a motion for an early general election under the Fixed-term Parliaments Act. The motion was passed in the House of Commons with a vote of 522 to 13.

In December 2020, the Conservative government published a draft Fixed-term Parliaments Act 2011 (Repeal) Bill, later retitled the Dissolution and Calling of Parliament Bill when it was introduced to the House of Commons in May 2021, which would repeal the Fixed-term Parliaments Act in its entirety, restore the monarch's prerogative powers to dissolve Parliament at the prime minister's request, and ensure that a parliamentary term automatically ends five years after a Parliament's first meeting and polling day being 25 working days later. The bill was given royal assent on 24 March 2022.

References

External links
 Frequently Asked Questions: General Election
 Election Timetables, House of Commons Library Research Paper 09/44, 13 May 2009
 Dissolution of Parliament 2010
 Prorogation of the 54th Parliament of the United Kingdom video on YouTube.

Parliament of the United Kingdom